Helmig is a surname. Notable people with the surname include:

 Christian Helmig (born 1981), Luxembourgish cyclist
 Dirk Helmig (born 1965), German footballer and manager
 Hugo Helmig (born 1998), Danish singer-songwriter
 Thomas Helmig (born 1964), Danish rock singer and musician